Milan Páleník (born 18 May 1977 in the Czech Republic) is a retired Czech footballer.

Position 
He had played as a central defender and with previous experience as a striker or attacking midfielder.

External links
 
 Soccer Terminal Stats

1977 births
Living people
Czech footballers
Czech expatriate footballers
Czech First League players
FC Baník Ostrava players
FK Mladá Boleslav players
FK Baník Most players
Dundee F.C. players
Scottish Professional Football League players
ASIL Lysi players
Cypriot Second Division players
FK Dukla Banská Bystrica players
FC DAC 1904 Dunajská Streda players
Slovak Super Liga players
Expatriate footballers in Slovakia
Czech expatriate sportspeople in Slovakia
Expatriate footballers in Scotland
Czech expatriate sportspeople in Scotland
Expatriate footballers in Cyprus
Czech expatriate sportspeople in Cyprus
Association football defenders
Place of birth missing (living people)